Ridgewood is a census-designated place (CDP) in Will County, Illinois, United States. It is northwest of the center of the county, bordered to the east and west by the city of Joliet. U.S. Route 30 runs along the southern edge of the CDP, leading west  to the center of Joliet and east  to Interstate 80.

Ridgewood was first listed as a CDP prior to the 2020 census.

Demographics

References 

Census-designated places in Will County, Illinois
Census-designated places in Illinois